This is a list of airlines currently operating in British Virgin Islands.

See also
 List of airlines

Virgin Islands
British Virgin Islands
Airlines